Admir Adžem (born 25 March 1973) is a Bosnian professional football manager and former player who is the current youth coach of UAE Pro League club Al Wasl.

Club career
In his playing career Adžem was a full-back. He played for a number clubs, including hometown club Željezničar on 4 occasions, Zagreb, Đerzelez, Pogoń Szczecin, GKS Katowice and Zagłębie Sosnowiec where he finished his career.

Adžem played in 104 league games and scored 6 career league goals for Željezničar, with whom he won all of his trophies. While playing for Željezničar he won the Bosnian Premier League 2 times, in the seasons 2000–01 and 2001–02, the Bosnian Cup 1 time, in the 2000–01 cup season, the same year that Željezničar completed the double (won the league and the cup in one season). He also won the Bosnian Supercup 3 times, in 1998, 2000 and in 2001.

For all the other clubs, Adžem made 114 league appearances and scored 1 goal while playing for Katowice, thus in total playing 228 league games and scoring 7 league goals in his career.

He finished his career in 2007 while playing for Zagłębie Sosnowiec at the age of 34.

International career
Adžem made his senior debut for Bosnia and Herzegovina in a February 1997 friendly match against Vietnam and has earned a total of 14 caps, scoring 1 goal. He played in both UEFA Euro 2000 and the 2002 FIFA World Cup qualifying campaigns. His final international was an August 2001 LG Cup match against Iran.

Managerial career

Željezničar
On 6 June 2014, Adžem was named new manager of Željezničar first team, replacing Dino Đurbuzović who was sacked earlier in the day. In 22 games, he amassed an impressive record of 11 wins, 7 draws and only 4 losses.

On 15 December 2014, Adžem had to be sacked from the position of manager due to not having an UEFA Pro Licence to manage a first team of any club. He went back to coach in the club's Youth School while also working on to finish obtaining his license.

Željezničar (youth)
Adžem coached the under-19 side of Željezničar from January 2015 to July 2017, with whom he won the Bosnian league title twice. First time in the 2014–15 season and the second time in the 2016–17 season.

In July 2019, Adžem became the new manager of the under-17 team of Željezničar. In his first match as the U17 team manager, his side beat the Borac Banja Luka U17 team on 20 July 2019. Adžem's first loss as the under-17 manager came on 3 August 2019, in a 1–0 away loss to the under-17 team of Zrinjski Mostar. On 27 July 2020, he left the under-17 team of Željezničar.

Return to Željezničar
On 23 July 2017, Adžem came back to the position of manager of Željezničar after almost 3 years of his first appointment.

In that season, Adžem won the club's first trophy in 5 years after beating Krupa in the two legged final of the 2017–18 Bosnian Cup. In the first game, Željezničar beat Krupa 2–0 and in the second game 4–2. He also could have won the double since Željezničar was for the majority of the season first in the league, but eventually finished in second place after a poor finish to the season.

Before the start of the pre-season, on 4 June 2018, Adžem was sacked.

Al Wasl (youth)
On 17 September 2020, it was confirmed that Adžem had become the new youth coach of UAE Pro League club Al Wasl.

Managerial statistics

Honours

Player
Željezničar 
Bosnian Premier League: 2000–01, 2001–02
Bosnian Cup: 2000–01
Bosnian Supercup: 1998, 2000, 2001

Manager
Željezničar 
Bosnian Cup: 2017–18

References

External links

1973 births
Living people
Footballers from Sarajevo
Association football fullbacks
Bosnia and Herzegovina footballers
Bosnia and Herzegovina international footballers
FK Željezničar Sarajevo players
NK Zagreb players
Pogoń Szczecin players
GKS Katowice players
Zagłębie Sosnowiec players
Premier League of Bosnia and Herzegovina players
Croatian Football League players
Ekstraklasa players
I liga players
Bosnia and Herzegovina expatriate footballers
Expatriate footballers in Croatia
Bosnia and Herzegovina expatriate sportspeople in Croatia
Expatriate footballers in Poland
Bosnia and Herzegovina expatriate sportspeople in Poland
Bosnia and Herzegovina football managers
FK Željezničar Sarajevo managers
Premier League of Bosnia and Herzegovina managers
Bosnia and Herzegovina expatriate football managers
Expatriate football managers in the United Arab Emirates
Bosnia and Herzegovina expatriate sportspeople in the United Arab Emirates